Piece of Me is the third studio album by American singer Lady Wray, released on January 28, 2022, by Big Crown Records.

Recording and production  
In 2018, Lady Wray began recording Piece of Me. Leon Michels and Thomas Brenneck produced the entire album, most of which was recorded at Michels' home studio. Wray's father Kenneth Wray Sr appears on the song "Beauty in the Fire". The song "Melody" features Wray's daughter Melody Bascote.

Singles 
In April 2019, Wray released the title-track single "Piece of Me". In August 2019, she released another single called "Come On In". In October 2020, the single "Storms" was released. In June 2021, she released "Games People Play". In October 2021, Wray released the single "Under the Sun", along with its music video. In November 2021, "Through It All" was released as the following single. In December 2021, "Thank You" was released as a single.

Track listing 
All songs written by Nicole Wray and produced by Leon Michels.

Personnel 
Credits adapted from album jacket notes.

 Nicole Wray – vocals
 Leon Michels – guitar, bass, drums, keyboards, saxophone, flute, percussion, vocals
 Nick Movshon – bass, drums
 Homer Steinweiss – drums
 Dylan Nowick – guitar, drums
 Paul Spring – guitar
 Kevin Martin – vocals
 Dave Guy – trumpet
 Marco Benevento – piano
 Max Shrager – guitar

Charts

References

2022 albums
Nicole Wray albums
Soul albums by American artists